Šmiklavž is a settlement in the City Municipality of Slovenj Gradec in northern Slovenia. The area is part of the traditional region of Styria. The entire municipality is now included in the Carinthia Statistical Region.

The parish church from which the settlement gets its name is dedicated to Saint Nicholas and belongs to the Roman Catholic Archdiocese of Maribor. It dates to the 13th and 16th centuries.  A second church on a hill south of the settlement is dedicated to Saint Helena. The earliest phases of the building date to the 13th century.

References

External links
Šmiklavž at Geopedia

Populated places in the City Municipality of Slovenj Gradec
Slovenj Gradec